The 1971 PGA Tour season was from January 7 to December 12. The season consisted of 44 official money events. Lee Trevino won the most tournaments, six, and there were 10 first-time winners. Trevino won two majors, the U.S. Open and The Open Championship, in a span of three weeks. In between, he also won the Canadian Open to become the first to win all three in the same season. The tournament results and award winners are listed below.

Dave Hill antitrust lawsuit
At the Colonial National Invitation, Dave Hill shot rounds of 77-85 to miss the cut. On his last hole, Hill threw a ball out of a sand trap. Hill was disqualified but it was for his signing a scorecard with an incorrect score on it. When Hill went to play in his next tournament, the Danny Thomas Memphis Classic, Hill was told he was being fined $500 for conduct unbecoming a professional golfer. Hill was required to pay the fine before teeing it up in the tournament. He did so but less than a week later, Hill filed a one-million dollar antitrust suit against the PGA Tour.  In response, the tour put Hill on probation for one year.  Hill then increased the amount of damages he was seeking to three-million dollars.  The litigation was resolved out of court in less than a year and Hill was taken off probation.

Schedule
The following table lists official events during the 1971 season.

Unofficial events
The following events were sanctioned by the PGA Tour, but did not carry official money, nor were wins official.

Awards

Notes

References

External links
PGA Tour official site
1971 season coverage at golfstats.com

PGA Tour seasons
PGA Tour